Oakover is a historic building in Shimla, Himchal Pradesh, India.  One of the earliest houses built in Shimla, it is the official residence of Chief Minister of Himachal Pradesh.

History
A British era building Oakover previously served as residence of Maharajas of former Patiala State.

Oakover cemetery was opened in 1828 and is considered the oldest British era cemetery in Shimla. It was in use until 1841 and has since fallen into disrepair and neglect.

In art and popular culture 
British photographer Samuel Bourne travelled through India beginning in January 1863. He also visited Shimla and took photos featuring Oakover: Oakover, Simla Simla, from Oakover and Jakko, from Oakover.

See also
 List of official residences of India

References 

Chief ministers' official residences in India
Buildings and structures in Shimla

British-era buildings in Himachal Pradesh